Prince of Clouds is a double concerto for two violins and string orchestra by the British-born composer Anna Clyne.  The work was jointly commissioned by the Chicago Symphony Orchestra, the IRIS Orchestra, the Los Angeles Chamber Orchestra, and the Curtis Institute of Music.  It was composed in the summer of 2012 at the Hermitage Artist Retreat and was first performed on November 3, 2012, in Germantown, Tennessee by the violinists Jennifer Koh and Jaime Laredo with the IRIS Orchestra under conductor Michael Stern.  The piece was nominated for the 2015 Grammy Award for Best Classical Contemporary Composition.

Composition
Prince of Clouds has a duration of roughly 14 minutes and is composed in a single movement.

Inspiration
Clyne described her inspiration for the piece in the score program notes, writing:

Reception
Reviewing the December 2012 Chicago premiere, Lawrence A. Johnson of the Chicago Classical Review compared the work favorably to Clyne's previous composition Within Her Arms and wrote, "Prince of Clouds is wrought with Clyne's characteristic craft and care, and offers the composer's brand of reflective introspection that is consistently attractive."  Mark Swed of the Los Angeles Times similarly praised, "Like Within Her Arms, the score is within her arms, which is to say that it has an enveloping quality. It begins with sweet, serene, intertwining violin solos, soon embraced by a sweet, intertwining string section."  Despite this, Swed nevertheless added:

References

Compositions by Anna Clyne
2012 compositions
Double violin concertos
Compositions for string orchestra
Music commissioned by the Chicago Symphony Orchestra
Music commissioned by the Los Angeles Chamber Orchestra
Music commissioned by the Curtis Institute of Music